The Minnesota-Wisconsin Baptist Convention (MWBC) is a group of churches affiliated with the Southern Baptist Convention located in the U.S. state of Minnesota and Wisconsin. Headquartered in Rochester, Minnesota, the convention is made up of 6 Baptist associations and around 150 churches as of 2010.

Affiliated Organizations 
Minnesota-Wisconsin Baptist Foundation
Minnesota-Wisconsin Baptist - the state newspaper

References

External links
Minnesota-Wisconsin Baptist Convention
 

Baptist Christianity in Minnesota
Baptist Christianity in Wisconsin
Conventions associated with the Southern Baptist Convention